Louis Floch (born 28 December 1947) is a French former professional footballer who played as a forward.

Honours 
Monaco

 Division 2 Group South: 1970–71

References

External links
Profile
Stats and interview

1947 births
Living people
French footballers
France international footballers
Stade Rennais F.C. players
AS Monaco FC players
Paris FC players
Paris Saint-Germain F.C. players
Stade Brestois 29 players
Association football forwards
Sportspeople from Finistère
Association football midfielders
Footballers from Brittany

Ligue 1 players
Ligue 2 players